Syed Imran Ahmad Shah (born 16 August 1962) is a Pakistani politician who has been a member of the National Assembly of Pakistan, since August 2018. Previously, he was a member of the National Assembly from 2008 to May 2018.

Early life
He was born on 16 August 1962.

Political career
He ran for the seat of the National Assembly of Pakistan as a candidate of Pakistan Muslim League (N) (PML-N) from Constituency NA-160 (Sahiwal-I) in 2002 Pakistani general election but was unsuccessful. He received 43,241 votes and lost the seat to Nouraiz Shakoor.

He was elected to the National Assembly as a candidate of PML-N from Constituency NA-160 (Sahiwal-I) in 2008 Pakistani general election. He received 59,373 votes and defeated Nouraiz Shakoor.

He was re-elected to the National Assembly as a candidate of PML-N from Constituency NA-160 (Sahiwal-I) in 2013 Pakistani general election. He received 99,553 votes and defeated Muhammad Ali Shakoor, a candidate of Pakistan Tehreek-e-Insaf (PTI).

In October 2017, he was appointed as chairperson of the National Assembly's standing committees on privatisation.

He was re-elected to the National Assembly as a candidate of PML-N from Constituency NA-147 (Sahiwal-I) in 2018 Pakistani general election.

References

Living people
Pakistan Muslim League (N) politicians
Punjabi people
Pakistani MNAs 2013–2018
Politicians from Sahiwal
1962 births
Pakistani MNAs 2008–2013